Tuure Valdemar Lehén (28 April 1893 in Jämsänkoski – 12 October 1976 in Helsinki) was a prominent Finnish communist and later Finnish-Soviet politician as well as a philosopher, journalist and historian.

Biography 
Lehén was born in to family of a carpenter. In 1915 he entered the University of Helsinki and studied in its Faculty of Philosophy. Initially, in 1913–18 as a member of the Social Democratic Party of Finland, and since 1918 as a member of the Communist Party of Finland. After the Civil War he underwent training in the Frunze Military Academy. He first came to prominence by writing texts on mob fighting and strike tactics, and in 1926 married Hertta Kuusinen.

From 1925 he was an illegal activist of the Communist Party of Germany for the Communist International.  Lehén also fought in the Spanish Civil War and was among the chief of staff of the International Brigades. Returning to Moscow in 1927, he was appointed head of the Central Military-Political School of the Executive Committee of the Communist International and studied in the International Lenin School.   

He served as Minister of Internal Affairs in the People's Provisional Government unsuccessfully orchestrated by the Soviet Union for Finland in December 1939. He was also the first rector (1940–41) of Karelo-Finnish, now Petrozavodsk State University. After World War II he became a general in the Red Army.

After the war in 1946, Lehén returned to Finland and continued his research work as the director of the publishing company Kansankulttuuri. Lehén's works interpreting Marx and Engels for Finns were long considered by Finnish Communists to be the most important works in the field used when studying Marxism-Leninism. The most famous of Lehén's philosophical and political works was the Working Class Worldview, written in the late 1940s.

Lehén bore the title of Honorary Doctor of Moscow State University. He died in 1976 in Helsinki and was buried at the Malmi Cemetery.

Works 
The Road to Victory (originally Der Weg zum Sieg ; pseudonym Alfred Langer). Published in German in 1926, in Finnish in 1928 and 1932. 
Työväenluokan maailmankatsomus: Luentoja dialektisesta materialismista. 2. painos 1950. Helsinki: Kansankulttuuri, 1950.
Kommunismi ja kristinusko. 2. painos 1953. Helsinki: Kansankulttuuri, 1951.
Kansa ja valtio: Luentoja marxilaisen valtio-opin alkeista. Helsinki: Kansankulttuuri, 1952.
Työväenluokan maailmankatsomus: Luentoja dialektisesta materialismista. 3. uusittu ja täydennetty painos. Kotka: [s.n.], 1959. Teoksen verkkoversio.
Työväenluokan maailmankatsomus: Luentoja dialektisesta materialismista. 4. painos. Helsinki: Kansankulttuuri, 1962.
Materialisteja ja idealisteja: Tutustumisretki filosofian historiaan. Helsinki: Kansankulttuuri, 1964.
Työväenluokan maailmankatsomus: Luentoja dialektisesta materialismista. Työväenliikkeen tietokirjoja, Taskusarja. 5. painos. – 6. painos 1972. – 7. painos 1976. Helsinki: Kansankulttuuri, 1971.
Vallankaappaushölmöily 1948. Kansankulttuuri 1948.
Kansa ja valtio (neuvostomarxismin mukaista valtio-oppia)
Punaisten ja valkoisten sota. Kansankulttuuri 1967.

References

External links

1893 births
1976 deaths
People from Jämsä
People from Häme Province (Grand Duchy of Finland)
Communist Party of Finland politicians
Government ministers of the Finnish Democratic Republic
First convocation members of the Soviet of Nationalities
Karelo-Finnish Soviet Socialist Republic people
People of the Finnish Civil War (Red side)
Finnish people of the Spanish Civil War
Finnish Comintern people
Finnish emigrants to the Soviet Union
Frunze Military Academy alumni
International Lenin School alumni
20th-century Finnish philosophers